The Eyemouth Herring Queen Festival celebrated in Eyemouth in the Borders, owes its origins to what was called the Peace Picnic or Fisherman's Picnic. The first Peace Picnic was organised by J. C. Chrystie to celebrate the end of the 1914 - 1918 war. This day came to be celebrated throughout the following years and to be looked upon as a local holiday for the fishermen of the town and all connected with their calling.

During the preliminary arrangements for the 1939 picnic, the committee felt that the crowning of a Queen would not only be of interest to the young folk of the town but would prove to be a ceremony in which they could symbolise, in many ways, the ideals as well as the everyday things associated with the life of a fishing community.

The modern way of life brought about many changes since the days of Chrystie but the symbolism is still the same: the children still enjoy their picnic and the Queen is still crowned. For a long period up to 2001, the Herring Queen was selected by popular vote in the local High School but this changed to a process whereby a panel of local townspeople make the selection after nominees were interviewed.

See also
Fishing industry in Scotland

External links
Eyemouth Herring Queen Festival

Festivals in Scotland
Tourist attractions in the Scottish Borders
Fishing in Scotland